Comin' Round the Mountain is a 1940 American comedy film directed by George Archainbaud and written by Lewis R. Foster, Maxwell Shane and Duke Atteberry. The film stars Bob Burns, Una Merkel, Jerry Colonna, Don Wilson, Pat Barrett, Harold Peary and Bill Thompson. The film was released on August 16, 1940, by Paramount Pictures.

Plot
After briefly moving to the big city, Jed Blower, a musician, moves back to his hometown in rural Tennessee and becomes mayor. He then tries to convince his family to go to the city and play their music on the radio.

Cast
Bob Burns as Jed Blower
Una Merkel as Belinda Watters
Jerry Colonna as Argyle Phifft
Don Wilson as Fictional Radio Program Announcer
Pat Barrett as Uncle Ezra Watters
Harold Peary as Mayor Gildersleeve
Bill Thompson as Barney Smoot 
Richard Carle as Lester Smoot
Marjorie Bauersfeld as Ma Beagle 
William Demarest as Gutsy Mann
Cliff Arquette as Droopy Beagle
Luke Cosgrave as Uncle Ditto
Leona Roberts as Aunt Polly Watters
Zeffie Tilbury as Granny Stokes 
Donald Hall as Hillbilly Boy
Brenda Fowler as Ma Blower
Olin Howland as Pa Blower
Walter Catlett as W.P.A. Clerk

References

External links 
 

1940 films
American comedy films
1940 comedy films
Paramount Pictures films
Films directed by George Archainbaud
American black-and-white films
1940s English-language films
1940s American films